"Nijeder Mawte Nijeder Gaan", is a 2021 Indian Bengali-language socio-political song released on social media by a platform named Citizens United, on 24 March 2021, just 3 days before Phase-I of 2021 West Bengal Legislative Assembly election held on 27 March 2021.

The song is a plea by the artistes to the people of Bengal to vote wisely. The message of the song is anti-BJP. However it does not name the party explicitly. The song also rebukes the 'ideology of hatred', highlighting the need to stop the 'fascist forces'. The song strongly criticises the RSS and the BJP-led governments at the Centre and the various states.

Background
In 2020, amid the Citizenship Amendment Act protests, Anirban Bhattacharya penned a poem in support of the protesters. He recited the poem on various occasions over the course of the protests. He along with his friend, Subhadeep Guha wanted to record the poem as a song. Their plans were hindered by the ongoing COVID-19 pandemic in India and the resulting lockdowns. The song was finally recorded in early March 2021, just in time to release before the elections in the state. According to Anirban, the song was his contribution to the CAA-NRC movement.

Music video

Features
The music video was shot in various locations across Kolkata including the Chinese Kali Bari, College Street and Jadavpur University highlighting the inclusive social fabric of Kolkata and West Bengal. It features books on the Constitution of India, Raktakarabi by Rabindranath Tagore among several others. It also extends support to the LGBTQ community, the farmer protestors and the individuals affected by CAA. Although, no Indian political party is mentioned by name, the Rashtriya Swayamsevak Sangh is mentioned once. It contains visuals of Nazi Germany interspersed with those from present-day India and invokes the legacy of Nazi Minister of propaganda Joseph Goebbels. At a point the Bengali song transitions into Faiz Ahmed Faiz's Hum Dekhenge. The video ends with a screening of the preamble of the Indian constitution.

Cast
List of performers appearing in the video (in order of appearance):

Riddhi Sen
Rwitobroto Mukherjee
Surangana Bandyopadhyay
Ujan Chatterjee
Subhadeep Guha
Arun Mukhopadhyay
Rudraprasad Sengupta
Anirban Bhattacharya
Parambrata Chattopadhyay
Suman Mukhopadhyay
Sabyasachi Chakraborty
Rahul Arunoday Banerjee
Anupam Roy
Anindya Chatterjee
Rupankar Bagchi
Shaantilal Mukherjee
Koushik Sen
Chandan Sen
Debraj Bhattacharya
Sampa Biswas
Debleena Dutt Mukherjee
Reshmi Sen
Piya Chakraborty
Sanorita Garu

Song credits
Lyrics: Anirban Bhattacharya
Composer: Subhadeep Guha
Singers: Arko Mukhaerjee, Subhadeep Guha, Anirban Bhattacharya, Anupam Roy, Anindya Chattopadhyay, Rupankar Bagchi, Debraj Bhattacharya, Sampa Biswas, Surangana Bandyopadhyay, Ujan Chatterjee, Rwitobroto Mukherjee, Riddhi Sen

Video credits
Directed by: Riddhi Sen, Rwitobroto Mukherjee
Screenplay: Riddhi Sen, Rwitobroto Mukherjee, Surangana Bandyopadhyay

Reception
The song received a lot of appreciation from social media users and received more than 1 lakh views within an hour of its upload on YouTube.

The line "Ami onyo kothao jabona, ami ei deshe tei thakbo", meaning "I won't go anywhere else and would continue to live in this country" slamming the narratives of 'Urban Naxals', 'anti-nationals', and 'go to Pakistan' that protestors and dissenters of the government are frequently targeted with, received significant praise from viewers.

In response to the song, then BJP MP Babul Supriyo and candidate for Legislative Assembly Rudranil Ghosh released a song titled "Didi tumi amader bhalobashona", meaning "Didi you don't love us" referring to chief minister Mamata Banerjee, popularly known as Didi. The music video also featured actress Rupa Bhattacharya.

See also
No Vote To BJP

References

2021 songs
Bengali-language songs
Citizenship Amendment Act protests
Protest songs
Indian songs